David James Blanchard (January 5, 1921December 23, 1962) was an American lawyer and Republican politician who served as the 63rd speaker of the Wisconsin State Assembly.  His father, George Washington Blanchard, was a U.S. congressman.

Biography
Blanchard was born on January 5, 1921, in Edgerton, Wisconsin. His father, George Washington Blanchard, was a member of the United States House of Representatives. Blanchard graduated from the University of Wisconsin and the University of Wisconsin Law School. He practiced law in Edgerton, Wisconsin. He married Carolyn Jensen, on September 29, 1943. Blanchard died of uremia on December 23, 1962, in Edgerton, Wisconsin.

Career
Blanchard was a member of the Assembly from 1955 until his death. He became Speaker in 1961. Additionally, Blanchard was a delegate to the 1960 Republican National Convention. He was succeeded in his Assembly seat by his wife.

References

External links

1921 births
1962 deaths
Speakers of the Wisconsin State Assembly
Republican Party members of the Wisconsin State Assembly
People from Edgerton, Wisconsin
University of Wisconsin–Madison alumni
University of Wisconsin Law School alumni
Wisconsin lawyers
20th-century American politicians
20th-century American lawyers